An Internet service provider (ISP) is an organization that provides services for accessing, using, managing, or participating in the Internet. ISPs can be organized in various forms, such as commercial, community-owned, non-profit, or otherwise privately owned.

Internet services typically provided by ISPs can include Internet access, Internet transit, domain name registration, web hosting, Usenet service, and colocation.

An ISP typically serves as the access point or the gateway that provides a user access to everything available on the Internet. Such a network can also be called as an eyeball network.

History
The Internet (originally ARPAnet) was developed as a network between government research laboratories and participating departments of universities. Other companies and organizations joined by direct connection to the backbone, or by arrangements through other connected companies, sometimes using dialup tools such as UUCP. By the late 1980s, a process was set in place towards public, commercial use of the Internet. Some restrictions were removed by 1991, shortly after the introduction of the World Wide Web.

During the 1980s, online service providers such as CompuServe and America On Line (AOL) began to offer limited capabilities to access the Internet, such as e-mail interchange, but full access to the Internet was not readily available to the general public.

In 1989, the first Internet service providers, companies offering the public direct access to the Internet for a monthly fee, were established in Australia and the United States. In Brookline, Massachusetts, The World became the first commercial ISP in the US. Its first customer was served in November 1989. These companies generally offered dial-up connections, using the public telephone network to provide last-mile connections to their customers. The barriers to entry for dial-up ISPs were low and many providers emerged.

However, cable television companies and the telephone carriers already had wired connections to their customers and could offer Internet connections at much higher speeds than dial-up using broadband technology such as cable modems and digital subscriber line (DSL). As a result, these companies often became the dominant ISPs in their service areas, and what was once a highly competitive ISP market became effectively a monopoly or duopoly in countries with a commercial telecommunications market, such as the United States.

In 1995, NSFNET was decommissioned removing the last restrictions on the use of the Internet to carry commercial traffic and network access points were created to allow peering arrangements between commercial ISPs.

Net neutrality

On 23 April 2014, the U.S. Federal Communications Commission (FCC) was reported to be considering a new rule permitting ISPs to offer content providers a faster track to send content, thus reversing their earlier net neutrality position. A possible solution to net neutrality concerns may be municipal broadband, according to Professor Susan Crawford, a legal and technology expert at Harvard Law School. On 15 May 2014, the FCC decided to consider two options regarding Internet services: first, permit fast and slow broadband lanes, thereby compromising net neutrality; and second, reclassify broadband as a telecommunication service, thereby preserving net neutrality. On 10 November 2014, President Barack Obama recommended that the FCC reclassify broadband Internet service as a telecommunications service in order to preserve net neutrality. On 16 January 2015, Republicans presented legislation, in the form of a U.S. Congress H.R. discussion draft bill, that makes concessions to net neutrality but prohibits the FCC from accomplishing the goal or enacting any further regulation affecting Internet service providers. On 31 January 2015, AP News reported that the FCC will present the notion of applying ("with some caveats") Title II (common carrier) of the Communications Act of 1934 to the Internet in a vote expected on 26 February 2015. Adoption of this notion would reclassify Internet service from one of information to one of the telecommunications and, according to Tom Wheeler, chairman of the FCC, ensure net neutrality. The FCC was expected to enforce net neutrality in its vote, according to The New York Times.

On 26 February 2015, the FCC ruled in favor of net neutrality by adopting Title II (common carrier) of the Communications Act of 1934 and Section 706 in the Telecommunications Act of 1996 to the Internet. The FCC Chairman, Tom Wheeler, commented, "This is no more a plan to regulate the Internet than the First Amendment is a plan to regulate free speech. They both stand for the same concept." On 12 March 2015, the FCC released the specific details of the net neutrality rules. On 13 April 2015, the FCC published the final rule on its new "Net Neutrality" regulations. These rules went into effect on 12 June 2015.

Upon becoming FCC chairman in April 2017, Ajit Pai proposed an end to net neutrality, awaiting votes from the commission. On 21 November 2017, Pai announced that a vote will be held by FCC members on 14 December 2017 on whether to repeal the policy. On 11 June 2018, the repeal of the FCC's network neutrality rules took effect.

Provisions for low-income families 
Most ISPs offer discounts to low-income families, with internet service available for as little as $10 a month. Eligibility for these programs usually requires documentation of enrollment in a government assistance program such as the Supplemental Nutrition Assistance Program (SNAP).

Classifications

Access providers
 
Access provider ISPs provide Internet access, employing a range of technologies to connect users to their network. Available technologies have ranged from computer modems with acoustic couplers to telephone lines, to television cable (CATV), Wi-Fi, and fiber optics.

For users and small businesses, traditional options include copper wires to provide dial-up, DSL, typically asymmetric digital subscriber line (ADSL), cable modem or Integrated Services Digital Network (ISDN) (typically basic rate interface). Using fiber-optics to end users is called Fiber To The Home or similar names.

Customers with more demanding requirements (such as medium-to-large businesses, or other ISPs) can use higher-speed DSL (such as single-pair high-speed digital subscriber line), Ethernet, metropolitan Ethernet, gigabit Ethernet, Frame Relay, ISDN Primary Rate Interface, ATM (Asynchronous Transfer Mode) and synchronous optical networking (SONET).

Wireless access is another option, including cellular and satellite Internet access.

Mailbox providers
A mailbox provider is an organization that provides services for hosting electronic mail domains with access to storage for mail boxes. It provides email servers to send, receive, accept, and store email for end users or other organizations.

Many mailbox providers are also access providers, while others are not (e.g., Gmail, Yahoo! Mail, Outlook.com, AOL Mail, Po box). The definition given in RFC 6650 covers email hosting services, as well as the relevant department of companies, universities, organizations, groups, and individuals that manage their mail servers themselves. The task is typically accomplished by implementing Simple Mail Transfer Protocol (SMTP) and possibly providing access to messages through Internet Message Access Protocol (IMAP), the Post Office Protocol, Webmail, or a proprietary protocol.

Hosting ISPs
Internet hosting services provide email, web-hosting, or online storage services. Other services include virtual server, cloud services, or physical server operation.

Transit ISPs

Just as their customers pay them for Internet access, ISPs themselves pay upstream ISPs for Internet access. An upstream ISP usually has a larger network than the contracting ISP or is able to provide the contracting ISP with access to parts of the Internet the contracting ISP by itself has no access to.

In the simplest case, a single connection is established to an upstream ISP and is used to transmit data to or from areas of the Internet beyond the home network; this mode of interconnection is often cascaded multiple times until reaching a tier 1 carrier. In reality, the situation is often more complex. ISPs with more than one point of presence (PoP) may have separate connections to an upstream ISP at multiple PoPs, or they may be customers of multiple upstream ISPs and may have connections to each one of them at one or more point of presence. Transit ISPs provide large amounts of bandwidth for connecting hosting ISPs and access ISPs.

Virtual ISPs
A virtual ISP (VISP) is an operation that purchases services from another ISP, sometimes called a wholesale ISP in this context, which allow the VISP's customers to access the Internet using services and infrastructure owned and operated by the wholesale ISP. VISPs resemble mobile virtual network operators and competitive local exchange carriers for voice communications.

Free ISPs 
Free ISPs are Internet service providers that provide service free of charge. Many free ISPs display advertisements while the user is connected; like commercial television, in a sense they are selling the user's attention to the advertiser. Other free ISPs, sometimes called freenets, are run on a nonprofit basis, usually with volunteer staff.

Wireless ISP
A wireless Internet service provider (WISP) is an Internet service provider with a network based on wireless networking. Technology may include commonplace Wi-Fi wireless mesh networking, or proprietary equipment designed to operate over open 900 MHz, 2.4 GHz, 4.9, 5.2, 5.4, 5.7, and 5.8 GHz bands or licensed frequencies such as 2.5 GHz (EBS/BRS), 3.65 GHz (NN) and in the UHF band (including the MMDS frequency band) and LMDS.

ISPs in rural regions 
It is hypothesized that the vast divide between broadband connection in rural and urban areas is partially caused by a lack of competition between ISPs in rural areas, where there exists a market typically controlled by just one provider. A lack of competition problematically causes subscription rates to rise disproportionately with the quality of service in rural areas, causing broadband connection to be unaffordable for some, even when the infrastructure supports service in a given area. 

In contrast, consumers in urban areas typically benefit from lower rates and higher quality of broadband services, not only due to more advanced infrastructure but also the healthy economic competition caused by having several ISPs in a given area. How the difference in competition levels has potentially negatively affected the innovation and development of infrastructure in specific rural areas remains a question. The exploration and answers developed to the question could provide guidance for possible interventions and solutions meant to remedy the digital divide between rural and urban connectivity.

Peering
ISPs may engage in peering, where multiple ISPs interconnect at peering points or Internet exchange points (IXPs), allowing routing of data between each network, without charging one another for the data transmitted—data that would otherwise have passed through a third upstream ISP, incurring charges from the upstream ISP.

ISPs requiring no upstream and having only customers (end customers or peer ISPs) are called Tier 1 ISPs.

Network hardware, software and specifications, as well as the expertise of network management personnel are important in ensuring that data follows the most efficient route, and upstream connections work reliably. A tradeoff between cost and efficiency is possible.

Law enforcement and intelligence assistance
Internet service providers in many countries are legally required (e.g., via Communications Assistance for Law Enforcement Act (CALEA) in the U.S.) to allow law enforcement agencies to monitor some or all of the information transmitted by the ISP, or even store the browsing history of users to allow government access if needed (e.g. via the Investigatory Powers Act 2016 in the United Kingdom). Furthermore, in some countries ISPs are subject to monitoring by intelligence agencies. In the U.S., a controversial National Security Agency program known as PRISM provides for broad monitoring of Internet users traffic and has raised concerns about potential violation of the privacy protections in the Fourth Amendment to the United States Constitution. Modern ISPs integrate a wide array of surveillance and packet sniffing equipment into their networks, which then feeds the data to law-enforcement/intelligence networks (such as DCSNet in the United States, or SORM in Russia) allowing monitoring of Internet traffic in real time.

See also

 Content delivery network
 Geo-blocking
 Index of Internet-related articles
 Internet hosting service
 Network service provider
 Outline of the Internet

References

External links

 Telecommunications Ownership and Control (TOSCO) dataset on the ownership of internet service providers.